Lake Poteriteri is the southernmost of the large lakes in Fiordland National Park in New Zealand's South Island. Only Lakes Hakapoua and Innes lie further south on the southern of New Zealand's two main islands.

The outflow of Poteriteri is the Waitutu River, a short  river which flows into the western end of Foveaux Strait.

The naming of the lake is unclear. The Māori word may mean 'to drift forwards and backwards', with another theory that the spelling of the lake should be Poutiritiri, which would translate as a 'post on which offerings are hung'. A third theory is that the spelling should be Poeteretere, in which case it would mean 'dripping wet'.

Access to the lake is via helicopter, a rough deer trail from Slaughter Burn or Harry's Track, a marked route from the outlet of Lake Hauroko.

See also
Lakes of New Zealand
List of lakes of New Zealand

References

Lakes of Fiordland